Antoine Villedieu (9 December 1887 - 17 July 1947) was a French politician.

Villedieu was born in Biollet.  He represented the French Section of the Workers' International (SFIO) in the Chamber of Deputies from 1935 to 1940. On 10 July 1940 he voted in favour of granting the Cabinet presided by Marshal Philippe Pétain authority to draw up a new constitution, thereby effectively ending the French Third Republic.

References

1887 births
1947 deaths
People from Puy-de-Dôme
Politicians from Auvergne-Rhône-Alpes
French Section of the Workers' International politicians
Members of the 15th Chamber of Deputies of the French Third Republic
Members of the 16th Chamber of Deputies of the French Third Republic